The 2017–18 season is the 15th season in the history of the Scarlets, a Welsh rugby union regional side based in Llanelli, Carmarthenshire. This season, they are competing in the newly revamped Pro14 as the defending champions, the Rugby Champions Cup and the Anglo-Welsh Cup. This season, Welsh international Liam Williams and Canadian international D. T. H. van der Merwe departed the club, while Welsh internationals Leigh Halfpenny and Tom Prydie and Australia Sevens international Paul Asquith were among the new arrivals.

Pre-season and friendlies

Although advertised as a home game, the match against the Premiership Select was played at Llandovery's Church Bank

Pro 14

Fixtures

Table
Conference B

Play-offs

European Champions Cup

Group stage

Fixtures

Table

Knockout stage

Anglo-Welsh Cup

Fixtures

Table

Statistics
(+ in the Apps column denotes substitute appearance, positions listed are the ones they have started a game in during the season)

Stats accurate as of match played 26 May 2018

Transfers

In

Out

References

2017-18
2017–18 Pro14 by team
2017–18 in Welsh rugby union
2017–18 European Rugby Champions Cup by team